On Monday, 1 October 2001, three militants belonging to Jaish-e-Mohammed carried out an attack on the Jammu and Kashmir State Legislative Assembly complex in Srinagar using a Tata Sumo loaded with explosives, ramming it into the main gate with three fidayeen suicide bombers. 38 people, plus the three attackers, were killed.

Attack
The attack took place at about 2 pm, one hour after close of business. One terrorist attacker drove a Tata Sumo loaded with explosives to the main entrance and exploded it. The other militants entered the building and seized control. All militants were killed in the ensuing gunbattle which lasted several hours. No Lawmaker was killed since they were meeting in temporary facilities as the legislature building had recently been damaged in a fire. Many senior leaders had already left the building. The speaker Mr Abdul Ahad Vakil was escorted to safety by the security forces.

Aftermath
The terrorist group Jaish-e-Mohammed claimed responsibility and named a Pakistani national Wajahat Hussain as the suicide bomber. Subsequently, the Indian foreign Ministry issued a strongly worded statement aimed clearly at the government of Pakistan. "India cannot accept such manifestations of hate and terror from across its borders" said the statement. "There is a limit to India's patience." Farooq Abdullah, chief minister of Jammu and Kashmir, eulogized the 38 victims and called for reprisal attacks on Pakistan, where the group blamed for the attack is based. "The time has come to wage a war against Pakistan and to bomb the militant training camps there" he said. "We are running out of patience."

See also

 2006 Srinagar bombings
 2013 Srinagar attack
 2013 CRPF camp attack at Bemina
 List of terrorist incidents in India
List of attacks on legislatures

References

21st-century mass murder in India
Kashmir conflict
Improvised explosive device bombings in India
Mass murder in 2001
Suicide car and truck bombings in India
Terrorist incidents in India in 2001
Islamic terrorism in India
2000s in Jammu and Kashmir
Religiously motivated violence in India
Massacres in Jammu and Kashmir
Attacks on legislatures
Islamic terrorist incidents in 2001
Attacks on buildings and structures in India
October 2001 crimes
Building bombings in India